Michael Woods is a writer and editor of comic books. His published work includes Creepy (Dark Horse), The Eisner and Harvey award nominated anthology Outlaw Territory (Image) and the Eisner and Harvey Award-winning anthology Popgun (Image).

References

Year of birth missing (living people)
Living people
American comics writers